Leigh Taylor-Young (born January 25, 1945) is an American actress who has appeared on stage, screen, podcast, radio and television. The most famous films in which she had important roles include I Love You, Alice B. Toklas (1968), The Horsemen (1971), The Gang That Couldn't Shoot Straight (1971), Soylent Green (1973), and Jagged Edge (1985).

Early life

Young was born in Washington, D.C. She added the surname Young, the surname of her stepfather, Donald E. Young, a Detroit executive. Her father was a diplomat, and her younger siblings are actress/sculptor Dey Young and writer/director/producer Lance Young. The siblings were raised in Oakland County, Michigan. Leigh graduated from Groves High School, Beverly Hills, Michigan in 1962. Before attending Northwestern University as an economics major, she spent a summer shifting scenery, modeling, acting, and sweeping up at a Detroit little theater. She left Northwestern before graduating to pursue a full-time acting career, making her professional debut on Broadway in 3 Bags Full. About dropping out of college, she said:

Career

1960s

Taylor-Young got her first big break in 1966, when she was cast as Rachel Welles on the primetime soap opera Peyton Place. Her character was written in the show as a replacement for the character of Allison MacKenzie, previously played by Mia Farrow. The series' producer, Everett Chambers, cast her because of her "great warmth and sweet angelic qualities not unlike Mia". When she received the role, Taylor-Young had been in California only a few days. She initially went there in April 1966 to recuperate from an attack of pneumonia. She impressed the head producer of Peyton Place, Paul Monash, with a performance from The Glass Menagerie and was immediately signed to a seven-year television and multiple-movie contract.

Shortly after, she told the press: "I'd have preferred to stay in New York to establish myself as an actress before coming to Hollywood."

It was on this series that she met Ryan O'Neal, whom she later married. Taylor-Young had difficulty working on the show, explaining in an April 1967 interview:
"When I got my first check for [3 Bags Full], I thought to myself, 'isn't this wonderful — being paid to have fun.' But after working in 70 chapters of Peyton Place out here in Hollywood, I'm glad to get my paycheck. I can now understand why good actors and actress complain about going stale in television. It's difficult to give a character depth when there's a man with a stop watch standing beside you complaining that the company is spending $3,000 a minute. Yes, I've learned that when you act in a TV series it becomes your whole life."

Despite the huge amount of publicity she received while working on Peyton Place, Taylor-Young left the soap opera in 1967 due to her pregnancy. She subsequently pursued a career in films, landing a lucrative seven-year contract with a major studio. Her first film role came opposite Peter Sellers in the comedy I Love You, Alice B. Toklas (1968). It was commercially successful, and she received a Golden Globe Award nomination for Most Promising Female Newcomer. She then appeared with husband Ryan O'Neal in The Big Bounce (1969).

1970s
For the next several years, her pictures tended to be high-budget films, such as The Adventurers (1970), based on the novel by best-seller Harold Robbins; and The Horsemen, (1971) with leading man Omar Sharif. She is perhaps best known for her performance as Shirl, the "furniture" girl, in the science fiction classic Soylent Green (1973).  After her appearance in Soylent Green, she made the professional decision to take a hiatus from acting in order to concentrate on raising her only child, son Patrick.

1980s
The 1980s saw Taylor-Young return to both film and television, where her looks and voice often led to casting in roles of an aristocratic bent. In 1981 she appeared in the high technology Michael Crichton production Looker. In 1985, she was cast as Virginia Howell in Jagged Edge, and appeared in the romantic comedy Secret Admirer.

In addition to her film work, she guest-starred on such television series as McCloud, Fantasy Island, The Love Boat, Hart to Hart, Hotel and Spenser: For Hire. She returned to her soap opera roots in 1983, appearing in the short-lived primetime series The Hamptons. From 1987–89, she played Kimberly Cryder, a recurring character on Dallas, her first role in a major prime time soap since Peyton Place.

Despite being best known for her film and television work, she has stated a preference for live theater, where her career began. Favoring Samuel Beckett, she starred opposite Donald Davis in Beckett's one act play Catastrophe (included in a trilogy of one-act plays billed as The Beckett Plays) at the Edinburgh International Festival in 1984. She also toured Los Angeles, New York City and London with the show.

1990s and 2000s
In recent decades, Taylor-Young's film credits have included minor roles in Honeymoon Academy (1990), Bliss (1997) and Slackers (2002), as well as direct-to-video films Addams Family Reunion (1998), Klepto (2003), Spiritual Warriors (2007) and The Wayshower (2011).

Perhaps her best-known television work was on the CBS series Picket Fences, playing mercurial and cougar-ish mayor Rachel Harris from 1993–1995. She won an Emmy Award for the role in 1994, for Outstanding Supporting Actress in a Drama Series, and received a Golden Globe nomination the following year. From 2004–2007 she played Katherine Barrett Crane on the soap opera Passions.

Taylor-Young also appeared on TV series such as The Young Riders, Murder, She Wrote, Sunset Beach, Malibu Shores, 7th Heaven, Star Trek: Deep Space Nine and Life. She had recurring roles on Beverly Hills, 90210, The Pretender, and UPN's The Sentinel. She also appeared in a handful of television films, including Perry Mason: The Case of the Sinister Spirit (1987), Who Gets the Friends? and Stranger in My Home (1997).

Personal life
Taylor-Young married Ryan O'Neal, her Peyton Place co-star, in 1967. Their wedding was spontaneous: While in Hawaii for a promotion for Peyton Place, an ABC manager offered them the opportunity to marry at his home. The marriage produced a son, Patrick. Leigh and O'Neal divorced in 1971. Through her son, she has two granddaughters.

She married John Morton in January 2013 at PRANA, headquarters of the Movement of Spiritual Inner Awareness in Los Angeles. She is an ordained minister in the Movement of Spiritual Inner Awareness, founded by the late John-Roger Hinkins and now led by her husband.

Filmography

Film

Television

References

External links

Leigh Taylor Young Recites "A Course In Miracles"

1945 births
Living people
20th-century American actresses
21st-century American actresses
Actresses from Washington, D.C.
American film actresses
American soap opera actresses
American stage actresses
American television actresses
Movement of Spiritual Inner Awareness
Northwestern University alumni
Outstanding Performance by a Supporting Actress in a Drama Series Primetime Emmy Award winners